The 1998 Speedway Grand Prix of Poland was the sixth race of the 1998 Speedway Grand Prix season. It took place on 18 September in the Polonia Stadium in Bydgoszcz, Poland It was the fourth Polish SGP, but first in Bydgoszcz. Grand Prix was won by Pole Tomasz Gollob, who was riding for Polonia Bydgoszcz in Polish League. It was his third winning in GP history.

Starting positions draw 

The Speedway Grand Prix Commission nominated Antonín Kasper, Jr. (Czech Republic) and two Poles: Robert Dados (1998 Under-21 World Champion who qualify to the 1999 Speedway Grand Prix) and Jacek Gollob as Wild Card.

Heat details

The intermediate classification

See also 
 Speedway Grand Prix
 List of Speedway Grand Prix riders

References

External links 
 FIM-live.com
 SpeedwayWorld.tv

P
Speedway Grand Prix
1998
1998